Lazer Maze is a 1982 turn-based strategy video game written by James D. Spain and published by Avant-Garde Creations.

Gameplay
Lazer Maze is a game in which two futuristic warriors from enemy sides engage in one-to-one combat.

Reception
Stanley Greenlaw reviewed the game for Computer Gaming World, and stated that "LM is a different kind of game and for that reason alone is worth looking at. It is a worthy addition to the arcade game field."

References

External links
Review in Electronic Games
Ahoy!
InCider
1984 Software Encyclopedia from Electronic Games
Review in Softalk

1982 video games
Apple II games
Atari 8-bit family games
Commodore 64 games
Science fiction video games
TI-99/4A games
Turn-based strategy video games
VIC-20 games
Video games developed in the United States